The Central Bank of Sudan is the central bank of Sudan. The bank was formed in 1960, four years after Sudan's independence. It is located in the capital Khartoum.

History
When Sudan achieved independence in 1956, the creation of a central bank was a priority. A 3-man commission of experts from the United States's Federal Reserve, worked with Sudanese government and finance specialists to create the Law of the Bank of Sudan for 1959, and in 1960 the Bank of Sudan began operations. To establish the bank, the Sudanese government nationalized the National Bank of Egypt's operations in the Sudan (some seven branches), and combined them with the Sudanese currency board.

In addition to the normal duties of a central bank, which may include minting coins and issuing banknotes, managing a country's internal and external accounting, and setting monetary policy and interest rates, Sudan's central bank is also responsible for fostering Islamic banking.

After Sudan introduced Islamic law (Sharia) in 1984, the banking and financial industry changed its practices to conform with Sharia. In 1993 the government established the Sharia High Supervisory Board (SHSB) to ensure compatibility of financial practices with Islamic principles. In compliance with the SHSB, the government is no longer selling treasury bills and government bonds; instead, the Bank sells "Financial Certificates" that comply with Islamic financial principles.

Banking history
In 1965, Bank of Sudan and Crédit Lyonnais formed a joint-venture bank named Al/An/El Nilein Bank (Nile Bank). Crédit Lyonnais contributed the two branches it had developed since it first entered Sudan in 1953. Bank of Sudan took 60 percent of the shares in Nilein Bank, and Crédit Lyonnais took 40 percent.

In 1970, the Sudanese government nationalized all the banks in the Sudan, changed the names of several, and put them under the Bank of Sudan. Barclays Bank, which had an extensive network of 24 branches, became the State Bank of Foreign Trade, and then Bank of Khartoum. The six branches of Egypt's Bank Misr became People's Cooperative Bank. The four branches of Jordan's Arab Bank became Red Sea Bank or Red Sea Commercial Bank (accounts differ). Commercial Bank of Ethiopia's one branch became Juba Commercial Bank. National and Grindlays Bank, which in 1969 had taken over the four branches that Ottoman Bank had established after it entered in 1949, became Omdurman Bank. In 1973 Red Sea Bank and People's Cooperative Bank were merged into Omdurman Bank. Then in 1984 Omdurman Bank merged with the Juba Commercial Bank to form Unity Bank.

In 1993, Al/An/El Nilein Bank merged with the Industrial Bank of Sudan to form Nilein Industrial Development Bank. In 2006, Dubai-based Emaar Properties and Amlak Finance acquired a 60% stake in Sudan’s El Nilein Industrial Development Bank; the Bank of Sudan retained a 40% stake.

Operations

As far as the current state of the Sudanese banking and financial situation is concerned, the bank's "About Bank of Sudan" section states:

Since the beginning of the Three Year Economic Program (1990–1993), the Bank of Sudan has carried out policies that aim to revitalize the Sudanese economy, the last of which was the credit policy of 2000 which was based on the following:

Emphasizing supply side measures and monetary stability better to utilize banking resources by stressing financing of priority economic priority sectors, and continuation of streamlining general supply policies.
Continuation of the social support program for the benefit of the poor families in accordance with the national mobilization project for social security and for the improvement of productivity.
Continuation of financing public corporations through the banks without recourse to the Bank of Sudan for direct financing.
Allowing the commercial banks to offer financing in foreign exchange according to the regulations issued by the Bank of Sudan.

Financial inclusion
The Bank is engaged in developing policies to promote financial inclusion and is a member of the Alliance for Financial Inclusion.

Branches of the Central Bank of Sudan
As the country of Sudan is about 1½ times the area of the state of Alaska in the United States, the central bank has a branch bank system:
 The Main Branch — Khartoum
 Wad Madani Branch
 Kosti Branch
 Atbara Branch
 Al Qadarif Branch
 Nyala Branch
 Juba Branch
 Al-Ubayyid Branch
 Dongola Branch
 Port Sudan Branch
 Al-Fashir Branch
 Wau Branch
 Malakal Branch

List of governors of the Central Bank of Sudan
 Mamoun Beheiry 1959–1963
 Elsayid Elfeel 1964–1967
 Abdelrahim Mayrgani 1967–1970
 Abdelateef Hassan 1970–1971
 Awad Abdel Magied Aburiesh 1971–1972
 Ibrahim Mohammed Ali Nimir 1973–1980
 Elsheikh Hassan Belail 1980–1983
 Faroug Ibrahim Elmagbool 1983–1985
 Ismail el-misbah Mekki hamad 1985–1988
 Mahdi Elfaky Elshaikh 1988–1990
 Elshaik SidAhmed Elshaikh 1990–1993
 Sabir Mohammed El-Hassan 1993–1996
 Abdall Hassan Ahmed 1996–1998
 Sabir Mohammed El-Hassan 1998-2011
 Mohamed Kheir El-Zubeir 8/3/2011 - 15/12/2013
 Abdelrahman Hassan Abdelrahman Hashim 15/12/2013 - 28/12/2016
 Hazim Abdegadir Ahmed Babiker 28/12/2016 - 16/6/2018
 Mohamed Kheir El-Zubeir 16/09/2018 - 6/03/2019
 Hussein Yahya Jangoul al-Basha 03/2019 - 10/12/2019
 Mohamed Elfatih Zein al-Abdein 19/03/2020 -
 Hussein Yahya Jangoul al-Basha 02/2022 -
Source:

Sources
Kaikati, Jack G. 1980. The Economy of Sudan: A Potential Breadbasket of the Arab World? International Journal of Middle East Studies 11, 99-123.

See also

 Sudanese pound
 Sudanese dinar
 Economy of Sudan
 List of central banks of Africa
 List of central banks

References

External links
 

Economy of Sudan
Government agencies of Sudan
Sudan
Banks of Sudan
Banks established in 1960
Khartoum
1960 establishments in Sudan